Gypsy (Cynthia "Cindy" Reynolds) is a superheroine appearing in American comic books published by DC Comics.

Publication history 
Created by Gerry Conway and Chuck Patton, Gypsy first appeared in Justice League of America Annual #2 (October 1984).

Fictional character biography 
Cynthia "Cindy" Reynolds was born to Edward and June Reynolds, who lived their lives in a peaceful, suburban home. Cindy grew up as an intelligent and experienced barefooter,(a person who chooses not to wear shoes) which became one of her trademarks as a teenager. Soon after Cindy's brother was born, Edward and June began to fight. Cindy tried to keep her parents together but also suffered abuse. When her illusion powers began to manifest at the age of fourteen, Cindy bought a one-way bus ticket to Detroit and ran away from home.

JLA Detroit 
Once Cindy arrived in Detroit, she used her chameleon and illusion-casting powers to protect herself from the normal dangers of city life. As she grew to adulthood, Cindy adopted the identity of "Gypsy", patterning her dress after common stereotypes of Romani dress. The Justice League soon took up residence in a neighborhood near Gypsy's stomping grounds after Aquaman disbanded the original League.

Shortly after the League moved into their new headquarters Gypsy began testing their security measures, eventually penetrating them and gaining access to the Hall Of Justice. Eventually, Gypsy becomes brave enough to follow along with the Justice League and to aid in the battle against the Overmaster and his Cadre. After successfully aiding her idols against Overmaster, the Justice League invited Cynthia to join their ranks to become a full-time member of 'The League.' Gypsy Accepted the League's offer participated in the Justice League's struggles against the power-mad Anton Allegro  and a reactivated Amazo.

Gypsy found cause to test her powers to their limits when the new JLA was unexpectedly ambushed by the Royal Flush Gang during a wilderness retreat. While her teammates were incapacitated, Gypsy ventured outside of her body, via astral projection. Gypsy used her astral form to spy on the Gang's activities. During the same retreat, Cindy received a dire premonition about the respective fates of her teammates Steel and Vibe respectively.
Despite Gypsy's warnings Steel and Vibe were doomed when they were killed by Professor Ivo during his bid to destroy the then current justice league. Gypsy was able, however, to save the rest of her teammates from the Amazo android Dr. Ivo dispatched to murder her, by finding its conscience. After reaching the android's emotions Cindy convinced it not to kill her. Though Ivo succeeded in killing Vibe (as Gypsy had foreseen), the android saw Cindy safely returned to her parents' custody.

Gypsy's domestic happiness was short-lived, as some time after Gypsy left the JLA, a vengeful Despero arrived at her home and murdered her parents. Gypsy would have been Despero's next victim, if not for the intervention of the Martian Manhunter and the rest of the Justice League. Although devastated by the loss of her family, Gypsy agreed to join Booster Gold's corporate-sponsored super team known as the Conglomerate.

Justice League Task Force 

During her time on the U.N's. Justice League Task Force team Gypsy grew close to the Martian Manhunter. Gypsy and Martian Manhunter were both mainstays of the short-lived team and the pair eventually form a sort of father/daughter relationship during their time serving together. During her time on the JLTF, Gypsy was nearly forced to battle Lady Shiva. On a different mission Cindy was left for dead by her teammates. Gypsy later joined a revamped version of the J.L.T.A. along with L-Ron (in the body of Despero), The Ray, and Triumph.

Gypsy and Ray were both later mind-controlled and used by Triumph during his strike against the reformed JLA. Ray forced the J.L.T.F. to attack the J.L.A. because he felt both the world and "the headliners" had forgotten about his team when the "JLA" Reformed. During the battle, Gypsy saw Aquaman, her old teammate in Detroit, confusedly telling him "you went away".

There were also been hints of a romantic relationship between Gypsy and the Bronze Tiger. Gypsy and J'onn keep in touch. At one point, after she had been killed, Gypsy was resurrected by the Manhunter, who plead with his Martian god, Hronmeer, to restore Cynthia to life. Cynthia also aided Wonder Woman during a massive battle against Circe.

Recent history 
Recently Gypsy has joined Barbara Gordon's Birds of Prey. In recent times Gypsy has demonstrated greater flexibility with her powers and is now able to extend her powers of invisibility to hide other people and things around her. Gypsy has also teamed up with Vixen to clean up the remnants of an old case. The two heroines rescued Stargirl after they discovered that Amos Fortune had been kidnapping members of the JSA.

Gypsy was one of the imprisoned heroes who were forced to fight at the behest of the Apokoliptan gods on Earth in the Dark Side Club. Gypsy spoke at Martian Manhunter's funeral where she, along with several other heroes, were telepathically compelled by the Martian Manhunter to recall Martian history.

Gypsy was again accosted by Despero, who brought her unconscious body to Happy Harbor and fights Vixen's ragtag Justice League.

During the Blackest Night storyline, Gypsy, Vixen and Doctor Light battle Black Lantern versions of several deceased members of the Justice League that were attacking the Hall of Justice.

The New 52 
In The New 52, Gyspy was not a member of the League, and first appeared as one of the captive metahumans imprisoned by Amanda Waller in a government holding facility. In, "The New 52," continuity Gypsy was a refugee from an alternate dimension, fleeing from Vibe's brother Rupture who was enslaved by Mordeth. Rupture revealed that Gypsy's full name in the new continuity is Cynthia Mordeth, as she was Mordeth's daughter.

Powers and abilities 
Gypsy's primary power is that of illusion casting, which allows her to blend into her background, effectively becoming invisible. It also allows her to adapt to rapidly changing backgrounds without betraying the illusion. She can camouflage both herself and someone in close proximity to her. In Gypsy's first appearance, only her shadow is shown from the Bunker's monitor, and she appears to teleport at the end of the issue.

Gypsy's illusion-casting can also be used to project frightening illusions into the minds of other people. These illusions usually show what the affected person fears most. This ability can affect other living things besides people, and Gypsy can use this ability in combat situations. Gypsy has the ability to project an illusion to appear as another person, but that person needs to be her approximate height and weight for it to appear authentic.

Gypsy's powers have evolved to the point that she can now cloak not only herself, but a moving vehicle and its passengers. Gypsy also has limited precognitive abilities and astral projection (able to project her spirit from her body).

Aside from her powers, Gypsy is an expert in hand-to-hand combat. She is also an accomplished acrobat, able to leap high, run fast, swim, and execute unexpectedly quick martial arts tactics with relative ease. Gypsy also has a strong aptitude in electronics and computers, and has become skilled in the use of firearms. She has been trained by Bronze Tiger.

Other versions

Justice League Unlimited 
Gypsy makes an appearance in issue #22 of the comic book tie-in of Justice League Unlimited.

Earth-16
The earth-16 version of Gypsy appears in The Multiversity #1 and #2 and The Multiversity: The Just #1.

In other media

Television 
 Gypsy made several background appearances in Justice League Unlimited as part of the expanded Justice League. This version has the ability to become intangible instead of her traditional comic book abilities.
 A variation of Gypsy named Cynthia appears in The Flash live-action series, portrayed by Jessica Camacho. This version is a bounty hunter from the parallel dimension of Earth-19 and has similar powers to Vibe. In season four, they enter a long-distance relationship, though they later break up. In season six, she is killed by Vibe's Earth-19 counterpart Echo.

Film 
An evil parallel Earth version of Gypsy named Gypsy Woman appears in the animated film Justice League: Crisis on Two Earths. This version is a member of the Crime Syndicate of America who can become intangible.

References 

Characters created by Chuck Patton
Characters created by Gerry Conway
Comics characters introduced in 1984
DC Comics American superheroes
DC Comics female superheroes
DC Comics martial artists
DC Comics metahumans
DC Comics orphans 
DC Comics characters who have mental powers
Fictional characters from Detroit
Fictional characters who can turn invisible
Fictional characters with precognition
Fictional illusionists
Romani comics characters